Tendu means "stretched" or "pulled" in French. It also may refer to:

 Tendu, Indre, a commune in France
 Tendu Gewog, a village block in Bhutan
 Tendu, local name of the tree Diospyros melanoxylon (East Indian Ebony)
 battement tendu, a dance or ballet movement
 Tendu, climbing technique